Victor P. Hamilton (born 26 September 1941) (PhD, Brandeis University) is a Canadian / American theologian. He was Professor of Old Testament and Theology at Asbury University from 1971 until 2007. His retains the role of professor emeritus of Old Testament at Asbury University.

He has a BA from Houghton College, New York, 1963 a BD and ThM from Asbury Theological Seminary, Wilmore, Kentucky, 1966 and 1967 and an MA and PhD in Mediterranean Studies from Brandeis University in Waltham, Massachusetts, 1969 and 1971.

He is author of major commentaries on Genesis and Exodus; also authoring the respected Handbook on the Historical Books.

Bibliography
Handbook on the Pentateuch: Genesis, Exodus, Leviticus, Numbers, Deuteronomy (Baker Academic, 1982) 
The Book of Genesis: Chapters 1-17 NICOT (Eerdmans, 1990) 
The Book of Genesis: Chapters 18-50 NICOT (Eerdmans, 1990) 
Handbook on the Historical Books: Joshua, Judges, Ruth, Samuel, Kings, Chronicles, Ezra-Nehemiah, Esther (Baker Academic, 2001) 
Exodus: An Exegetical Commentary (Baker Academic, 2011)

References

External links
Publisher's author profile

20th-century American theologians
Living people
1941 births
Asbury University faculty
Brandeis University alumni